The Sunshine Millions Filly & Mare Sprint is an American race for thoroughbred horses held in January at Santa Anita Park in Arcadia, California or at Gulfstream Park in Hallandale Beach, Florida as part of the eight-race Sunshine Millions series. Half the eight races of the Sunshine Millions are run at one track and half at the other.

Open to fillies (younger than 5 years) and mares (5 years and older) willing to race six furlongs on the dirt, the Sunshine Millions Fillies & Mares Sprint is a restricted stakes carrying a purse of $150,000.

In its 15th running in 2017, the series of races called the Sunshine Millions is restricted to horses bred in Florida or California and is the brainchild of the Thoroughbred Owners of California, the California Thoroughbred Breeders Association, the Florida Thoroughbred Breeders' and Owners’ Association, Inc., Santa Anita Park, Gulfstream Park, and Magna Entertainment Corp.

Winners

References
 Official site of the Sunshine Millions
 Sunshine Millions Filly & Mare Sprint at Pedigree Query

Restricted stakes races in the United States
Horse races in Florida
Sprint category horse races for fillies and mares
Horse races in California